The Sixth of February Movement or '6th FM' (Arabic: حركة السادس من فبراير | Harakat al-Sadis min Fibrayir), also known as Mouvement du 6 février in French, was a small, predominantly Sunni Nasserist political party and militia active in Lebanon from the early 1970s to the mid-1980s.

Structure and organization
Based at West Beirut, the '6th FM' strength was estimated at about 100–150 fighters armed and trained by the Palestine Liberation Organization (PLO).

The Civil War years | 1975–1986
The '6th FM' joined the ranks of the Lebanese National Movement (LNM) and its military wing, the Joint Forces (LNM-JF), during the 1975–77 phase of the Lebanese Civil War, fighting alongside other Nasserist-oriented factions.  However, the political collapse of the LNM in the wake of the June 1982 Israeli invasion of Lebanon and the subsequent departure of the PLO from Beirut meant that the smaller Nasserist militias ('6th FM' included) had to fend for themselves.  

Their unwavering support for the PLO resulted in the adoption of a hostile stance regarding Syria's military presence in Lebanon and when the War of the Camps broke out at Beirut in May 1985, the '6th FM' allied itself with the pro-Arafat Palestinian refugee camp militias, the Al-Mourabitoun, the Communist Action Organization in Lebanon (OCAL), and the Kurdish Democratic Party – Lebanon (KDP-L) against a powerful coalition of Druze Progressive Socialist Party (PSP), Lebanese Communist Party (LCP), and Shia Muslim Amal movement militia forces backed by Syria, the Lebanese Army, and anti-Arafat dissident Palestinian guerrilla factions. Eventually, the '6th FM' bore the brunt of this all-out offensive until being finally suppressed by the Amal Movement in June 1986.  This faction is no longer active.

See also 
Amal Movement
Al-Mourabitoun
Lebanese National Movement
Lebanese Civil War
 List of weapons of the Lebanese Civil War
People's Liberation Army (Lebanon)
Popular Guard
War of the Camps
6th Infantry Brigade (Lebanon)
8th Infantry Brigade (Lebanon)

Notes

References

Edgar O'Ballance, Civil War in Lebanon, 1975–92, Palgrave Macmillan, London 1998. 
 Fawwaz Traboulsi, A History of Modern Lebanon: Second Edition, Pluto Press, London 2012. 
 Rex Brynen, Sanctuary and Survival: the PLO in Lebanon, Boulder: Westview Press, Oxford 1990.  – 
Robert Fisk, Pity the Nation: Lebanon at War, London: Oxford University Press, (3rd ed. 2001).  – 
 Marius Deeb, The Lebanese Civil War, Praeger Publishers Inc., New York 1980. 
 William W. Harris, Faces of Lebanon: Sects, Wars, and Global Extensions, Princeton Series on the Middle East, Markus Wiener Publishers, Princeton 1997. , 1-55876-115-2

Arab nationalism in Lebanon
Arab nationalist militant groups
Factions in the Lebanese Civil War
Israeli–Lebanese conflict
Lebanese National Movement
Nasserist organizations